Gori Teri Aankhen... is a studio album by Lucky Ali. The music of the album was composed by Lucky Ali. The album featured various artists. Lucky featured in 3 out of 8 songs of the album.

Track listing 
The album consists of eight songs:
 Gori Teri Aankhen...	
 Duniya Choomegi Tere Kadam
 Chali Chali Man Chali
 Aaye Jabse Woh Meri Zindagi Mein
 Dekho Yeh Jo Meri Hai Ada
 Kuch Aisa Ho Woh Meri Zindagi	
 Aji Zara Baat Samjho Na
 Dum Dum Diga Diga

See also 
 Lucky Ali discography

References 

2001 albums
Lucky Ali albums